Shawn Vernon Miller (born March 14, 1961) is a former American football defensive end in the National Football League. He was signed by the Los Angeles Rams as an undrafted free agent in 1984. He played college football at Utah State.

References

1961 births
Living people
American football defensive ends
American football defensive tackles
Utah State Aggies football players
Los Angeles Rams players
National Football League replacement players
Sportspeople from Ogden, Utah